Justin M. Gross is an American voice actor. Gross is best known as the voice of Arthas Menethil in Warcraft III, Ryu Hayabusa in the Ninja Gaiden games, and Steve Rogers/Captain America in the Ultimate Avengers series. He has also voiced thousands of media projects such as television and radio commercials, show narrations, promos, websites and B2B videos. Gross currently resides in Grass Valley, California, where he works primarily from his home studio. He graduated from Sonoma State University.

Filmography

Voice roles

Films
Ultimate Avengers as Captain America
Ultimate Avengers 2 as Captain America

Video games

Dubbing roles

Anime
Angel Tales as Goh
DearS as Hironobu Nonaka
Ikki Tousen as Genpo Saji
Mermaid Forest as Yuta
NieA Under 7 as D.J. / Geronimo Hongo / Newscaster
Paranoia Agent as Newscaster
R.O.D -The TV- as Chief
Spirit of Wonder Scientific Boys Club as Jack
Starship Girl Yamamoto Yohko as Chief Engineer Curtis Lawson
Starship Girl Yamamoto Yohko II as Chief Engineer Curtis Lawson
Strawberry Eggs as Mario Yodogawa
Texhnolyze as Ichise

Video games

References

External links
 
 
 

American male voice actors
Living people
Sonoma State University alumni
Year of birth missing (living people)
Place of birth missing (living people)